Allen Vince (ca. 1785–1849) was one of Stephen F. Austin's Old Three Hundred.

References
"The Old Three Hundred: A List of Settlers in Austin's First Colony," Lester G. Bugbee, Quarterly of the Texas State Historical Association(October 1897).
"Y.P. Alsbury letter" Texas Archives
"John Coker" Texas Historical Commission historical marker.
"Battle of San Jacinto" Texas Historical Commission historical marker.

1780s births
1849 deaths
People from Georgia (U.S. state)
People of the Republic of Texas
People of Mexican Texas
Old Three Hundred